Umut Koçin (born 2 June 1988) is a German former professional footballer who played as an attacking midfielder.

References

External links
 

1988 births
Living people
German footballers
Turkish footballers
Association football midfielders
Turkey under-21 international footballers
Turkey youth international footballers
Kayserispor footballers
Kapfenberger SV players
RB Leipzig players
Karşıyaka S.K. footballers
Pazarspor footballers
Nazilli Belediyespor footballers
Hamburger SV II players
SC Concordia von 1907 players
Süper Lig players
TFF First League players
TFF Second League players
Regionalliga players
Footballers from Hamburg
German expatriate footballers
Turkish expatriate footballers
German expatriate sportspeople in Austria
Turkish expatriate sportspeople in Austria
Expatriate footballers in Austria